Domenico Muzzi (1742  – 1812) was an Italian painter and professor of Design at the Accademia di Belle Arti of Parma. 

He trained in Parma at the Academy under Giuseppe Peroni. He painted frescoes for the Palazzo Sanvitale, Parma and the cupola of the church of San Liborio at Colorno.

Among his pupils were Antonio Pasini. and Michele Plancher.

References

1742 births
1812 deaths
18th-century Italian painters
Italian male painters
19th-century Italian painters
Painters from Parma
19th-century Italian male artists
18th-century Italian male artists